The 1957 New Mexico Lobos football team represented the University of New Mexico in the Skyline Conference during the 1957 NCAA University Division football season.  In their second and final season under head coach Dick Clausen, the Lobos compiled a 4–6 record (2–4 against Skyline opponents), finished fifth in the conference, and were outscored by opponents by a total of 144 to 140. The Lobos won four of five games to open the season, but closed the season with five consecutive losses.

The team's statistical leaders included Chuck Roberts with 305 passing yards and Don Perkins with 744 rushing yards and 162 receiving yards.

In May 1958, Dick Clausen retired as New Mexico's head football coach to become the athletic director at the University of Arizona. Clausen was immediately replaced by Marv Levy.

Schedule

References

New Mexico
New Mexico Lobos football seasons
New Mexico Lobos football